CJPE may refer to:

 Canadian Journal of Program Evaluation, a professional journal
 CJPE-FM 99.3 MHz, Picton, Ontario, Canada; a radio station

See also

 WJTE-LP 98.5 MHz, East Berstadt, Kentucky, USA; a low-power radio station
 JPE (disambiguation)